Miroslav Grebeníček (born 21 March 1947 in Staré Město) is a Czech politician who was leader of the Communist Party of Bohemia and Moravia (KSČM) from 1993 to 2005. He was a member of the Chamber of Deputies from 1993 to 2021, with only six months absence in 2013.

References 

1947 births
Living people
Communist Party of Bohemia and Moravia MPs
Masaryk University alumni
Czech communists
Leaders of the Communist Party of Bohemia and Moravia
People from Staré Město (Uherské Hradiště District)
Communist Party of Czechoslovakia politicians
Members of the Chamber of Deputies of the Czech Republic (2017–2021)
Members of the Chamber of Deputies of the Czech Republic (2013–2017)
Members of the Chamber of Deputies of the Czech Republic (2006–2010)
Members of the Chamber of Deputies of the Czech Republic (2002–2006)
Members of the Chamber of Deputies of the Czech Republic (1998–2002)
Members of the Chamber of Deputies of the Czech Republic (1996–1998)
Members of the Chamber of Deputies of the Czech Republic (1992–1996)